Norway and Sweden have a very long history together. They were both part of the Kalmar Union between 1397 and 1523, and a personal union between 1814 and 1905. The countries established diplomatic relations in 1905, after the dissolution of the union.

Sweden has an embassy in Oslo and 14 consulates, in Ålesund, Arendal, Bergen, Bodø, Hamar, Hammerfest, Kirkenes, Mandal, Moss, Narvik, Porsgrunn, Stavanger, Tromsø and Trondheim. Norway has an embassy in Stockholm and three consulates, in Gothenburg, Malmö and Sundsvall.

Both countries are full members of the Council of Europe and the Nordic Council. There are around 44,773 Swedes living in Norway and 41,062 Norwegians living in Sweden.

International border

Crossing the border between Sweden and Norway is relatively simple. No passport is required due to the Nordic Passport Union and there are no physical border obstructions. However, since Norway is not part of the European Union customs controls can be made if traveling by car to prohibit smuggling. Foreign citizens requiring visa to either state are not allowed to cross the border legally without applying for visa again. There are no restrictions on non-felon Swedish and Norwegian people's rights to live in the neighbouring country.

European Union
Sweden joined the EU in 1995. Norway has never been a member of the EU.

NATO 
While Norway was one of the founding members of NATO, Sweden has never been a member of NATO.

See also  
Foreign relations of Norway 
Foreign relations of Sweden
Union between Sweden and Norway
Norwegian Swedes
Swedes in Norway

References 

 
Sweden
Bilateral relations of Sweden